Myroslav Omelyanovych Bundash (born 22 December 1976) is a former Ukrainian footballer. Since 2012 he coaches professional clubs as an assistant coach.

References

External links 
 Official Website Profile
 
 

1976 births
Living people
Sportspeople from Zakarpattia Oblast
Ukrainian footballers
Ukrainian expatriate footballers
Expatriate footballers in Latvia
Ukrainian expatriate sportspeople in Latvia
Expatriate footballers in Kazakhstan
Ukrainian expatriate sportspeople in Kazakhstan
Ukraine student international footballers
FC Karpaty Mukacheve players
FC Hoverla Uzhhorod players
FK Rīga players
FC Zirka Kropyvnytskyi players
FC Atyrau players
PFC Sumy players
FC Uzhhorod players
Ukrainian Premier League players
Ukrainian First League players
Ukrainian Second League players
Association football forwards